Vukan Perović (Cyrillic: Вукан Перовић; born 18 October 1952) is a Montenegrin retired professional footballer who played as a striker.

Career
Perović began playing professional football in the Yugoslav First League for FK Partizan. After spending two seasons with the club, he moved to Turkey where he would play with Adanaspor for one season. Next, he had a brief stint in the United States with the Tulsa Roughnecks.

Perović joined Austrian side Rapid Vienna in 1978, scoring 21 goals in 42 league matches during his two seasons with the club. Rapid allowed Perović to go on trial with Spanish club Real Betis, but they ultimately loaned him to Segunda División side Elche in December 1980. He scored eight goals in twelve games for Elche, but the club did not exercise an option to purchase his contract. He returned to Rapid for the 1982–83 season.

References

External links
 

1952 births
Living people
Footballers from Nikšić
Association football forwards
Yugoslav footballers
FK Partizan players
Adanaspor footballers
Tulsa Roughnecks (1978–1984) players
SK Rapid Wien players
Elche CF players
Yugoslav First League players
Süper Lig players
North American Soccer League (1968–1984) players
Austrian Football Bundesliga players
Segunda División players
Yugoslav expatriate footballers
Expatriate footballers in Turkey
Yugoslav expatriate sportspeople in Turkey
Expatriate soccer players in the United States
Yugoslav expatriate sportspeople in the United States
Expatriate footballers in Austria
Yugoslav expatriate sportspeople in Austria
Expatriate footballers in Spain
Yugoslav expatriate sportspeople in Spain